Joan Ellen Pease (born 15 September 1961) is an Australian politician. She has been the Labor member for Lytton in the Queensland Legislative Assembly since 2015. Her previous work included providing training programs for the long term unemployed and running a small business.

References

1961 births
Living people
Members of the Queensland Legislative Assembly
Australian Labor Party members of the Parliament of Queensland
21st-century Australian politicians
Women members of the Queensland Legislative Assembly
Labor Right politicians
21st-century Australian women politicians